The Seattle Warbirds were a women's professional American football team based in Seattle, Washington. They were founded by head coach Michael Stuart and general manager Joshua Creel in 2001 in the Women's American Football League.

The Warbirds only played in the 2001 WAFL season, finishing 9–0–1 and winning the Pacific Northwest Division title before losing to the Arizona Caliente in the Pacific Conference semifinals. The next season, most of the players left to form the Tacoma Majestics in the Independent Women's Football League (IWFL). In 2006, the Warbirds merged with Tacoma to become the Seattle Majestics in the IWFL.

Ten years later, the Warbirds announced they would return to play in the Women's Football Alliance (WFA) for the 2011 season. However, the team would never play a game in the WFA.

References

Women's Football Alliance teams
American football in Seattle
American football teams established in 2001
American football teams disestablished in 2006
2001 establishments in Washington (state)
2006 disestablishments in Washington (state)
Women's sports in Washington (state)